Digital branding is a brand management technique that uses a combination of internet branding and digital marketing to develop a brand over a range of digital venues, including internet-based relationships, device-based applications or media content.

Concept 
Digital branding aims to create connections between consumers and the products or service being delivered  so that brand recognition is established in the digital world. In short, the goal of digital branding is not necessarily driving sales, but enhancing the awareness, image, and style of the brand. Digital branding in turn drives long-term customer loyalty.

Brand establishment involves four key points:
 Building a digital brand story
 Creativity in digital media and marketing
 Digital channels and content distributed to channels based on consumer data and habits
 Creating digital relationships.

Digital impact on branding
Before the internet, information about companies and consumers was somewhat limited due to access to information, geographical separation, and lack of interaction. The existence of the internet and websites has therefore transformed branding: the internet has transformed interaction between brands and customers; and websites facilitate online marketing and sales, as well as collecting comprehensive data on customers.

Companies now have a powerful online means to showcase their brand identity and value in an innovative, efficient format. The digitization has provided the brands with new methods of customer engagement and consistent branding promotion. It has heightened the connectivity between brands and consumers.

Another impact on branding practices is the emergence of value co-creation as an alternative way to long-term customer relationships, customer loyalty, and eventual profitability. Joint effort is formed between the companies and customers during the various stages of the product. It strengthens the bond and builds loyalty and customer engagement. Coca-Cola is one example of successful value co-creation.

In addition to engaging with the customers, there is increasing and active collaboration between the companies and their business intermediaries. This leads to collaborative and healthy promotion, innovative re-designing and a sense of co-existence among competitors in the market. One example of this is how Coca-Cola collaborated with Heinz to develop more sustainable containers.Every user of the internet will eventually need a product or service. Digital branding services positions a brand in such a way that connects to those users, the right audience. Effective digital branding involves a number of methods such as search engine optimization (SEO), online advertising, content marketing, social media, and influencer marketing.

Digital branding channels 
According to Mabbly CEO, Hank Ostholthoff, digital branding is facilitated by multiple channels. As an advertiser, one's core objective is to find channels that result in maximum two-way communication and a better overall return-of-investment for the brand.

There are multiple online marketing channels available, namely:

 New media marketing
 Cross-media marketing
 Retail media
 Affiliate marketing
 Display advertising
 Internet branding
 Email marketing
 Search marketing
 Social media
 Social networking
 Online PR
 Game advertising
 Video advertising
 SMS marketing
 Branding on MetaVerse

Personal digital branding 

As social media platforms have been established and have evolved over the last couple of decades, digital branding has become personal. Individuals have taken to social media to brand and market themselves in building their personal and professional lives. Consequently, boundaries between the personal and professional are fading.

Those who participate in social media sites should be aware that their social media content is public and may be accessed by colleagues, clients, and other professional references. Many universities and workplaces have established social media policies.  A well-curated social media presence may be attractive to employers, while poorly representing oneself is an employment liability.

See also
 Brand engagement
 Brand implementation
 Brand management
 Online advertising
Search engine results page
 Social media marketing
 Visual marketing

References

Further reading

Digital marketing
Brand management
Types of branding